Crows is an unincorporate hamlet in Alleghany County, Virginia, United States.  There are no businesses or services, only residences.  The hamlet was named for a local family, the Crow family.

References
GNIS reference

Unincorporated communities in Virginia
Unincorporated communities in Alleghany County, Virginia